Carlos Alberto "Charly" Rodríguez Gómez (born 3 January 1997) is a Mexican professional footballer who plays as a midfielder for Liga MX club Cruz Azul and the Mexico national team.

Club career
Rodríguez originally hailed from C.F. Monterrey's youth academy. He made his professional debut with Monterrey on 28 September 2016, in a 2016–17 CONCACAF Champions League group stage match against Don Bosco, winning 3–0. Loaned out to Spanish third division team Toledo, he made 30 league appearances along with scoring three goals.

Returning to Monterrey for the 2018–19 season, he made his Liga MX debut on 20 October 2018, coming on as a substitute in a 2–1 victory over Toluca. He would score his first goal with Monterrey on 15 February 2019, in a 3–2 victory over Monarcas Morelia. He would prove to be a vital part of the club as they would win the 2019 CONCACAF Champions League Finals against town rivals Tigres UANL and be included in the competition's Team of the Tournament.

On 14 December, in the 2019 FIFA Club World Cup quarter-final match against Al Sadd, he would score Monterrey's third goal in a 3–2 victory. At the end of the month, he disputed in both legs of the Apertura championship finals against América. He would score an own goal in the first leg but Monterrey eventually won the match with a 2–1 score. After a 1–2 loss in the second leg, Monterrey would win the finals after defeating América in a penalty shoot-out. He was eventually included in the Best XI of the Apertura 2019.

With Monterrey's victory of the 2019–20 Copa MX, they had obtained the continental treble.

International career

Youth
Rodríguez participated at the 2020 CONCACAF Olympic Qualifying Championship, scoring one goal in all five matches, where Mexico won the competition. He was subsequently called up to participate in the 2020 Summer Olympics. Rodríguez won the bronze medal with the Olympic team.

Senior
Five months after his Liga MX debut, Rodríguez was included in Gerardo Martino's first minicamp, and on 22 March 2019, he made his debut for the senior national team in a friendly against Chile, as a starter. Following his debut, Martino stated "Carlos Rodríguez plays like he plays, which looks like a 30-year-old."

In May 2019, Rodríguez was included in the preliminary roster for the 2019 CONCACAF Gold Cup and was included in the final list. He would appear in all matches of the tournament as Mexico went on to win the final against the United States.

In October 2022, Rodríguez was named in Mexico's preliminary 31-man squad for the 2022 FIFA World Cup, and in November, he was ultimately included in the final 26-man roster.

Personal life
On 6 October 2020, Rodríguez tested positive for COVID-19. Following a self-imposed quarantine, he resumed training with Monterrey about two weeks later.

Career statistics

Club

International

Honours
Monterrey
Liga MX: Apertura 2019
Copa MX: 2019–20
CONCACAF Champions League: 2019, 2021

Cruz Azul
Supercopa de la Liga MX: 2022

Mexico U23
CONCACAF Olympic Qualifying Championship: 2020
Olympic Bronze Medal: 2020

Mexico
CONCACAF Gold Cup: 2019

Individual
Liga MX Best XI: Apertura 2019
CONCACAF Champions League Team of the Tournament: 2019

References

External links

Carlos Rodríguez at Rayados 

1997 births
Living people
Footballers from Nuevo León
Association football midfielders
C.F. Monterrey players
CD Toledo players
Cruz Azul footballers
Liga MX players
Segunda División B players
Mexico international footballers
2019 CONCACAF Gold Cup players
CONCACAF Gold Cup-winning players
Footballers at the 2020 Summer Olympics
Olympic footballers of Mexico
Olympic medalists in football
Olympic bronze medalists for Mexico
Medalists at the 2020 Summer Olympics
Mexican expatriate footballers
Mexican expatriate sportspeople in Spain
Expatriate footballers in Spain
2022 FIFA World Cup players
Mexican footballers